Patrick Miller (born May 22, 1992) is an American professional basketball player for Brose Bamberg of the Basketball Bundesliga (BBL). He played college basketball for Tennessee State.

High school career
Miller played basketball at Chicago's Hales Franciscan High School, averaging 22.6 points and 3.8 assists per game in 32 games as a senior, leading his team to a 28–4 record, winning the Regional and Sectional Championships. He was named Chicago All-Area two times and was voted 2009–2010 Chicago Catholic League Player of the Year.

College career
Miller joined the Tennessee State Tigers as a freshman in 2010–11. In 2012–13, he led the Ohio Valley Conference with 5.8 assists per game and was named to the All-OVC first team. The following season, he scored 23.7 points per game to rank fifth in NCAA Division I.

Professional career
On July 8, 2014, Miller signed with Beşiktaş of Turkey for the 2014–15 season. In January 2015, he left Beşiktaş after appearing in just three Eurocup games and joined Yeşilgiresun of the Turkish Basketball Second League for the rest of the season. In 25 games for Yeşilgiresun, he averaged 13.8 points, 3.0 rebounds, 3.6 assists and 1.2 steals per game while helping the team win the championship. On June 29, 2015, he extended his contract with Yeşilgiresun for the 2015–16 season. However, he later parted ways with the club on August 31.

On October 31, 2015, Miller was selected by the Oklahoma City Blue in the second round of the 2015 NBA Development League Draft, only to be traded to the Texas Legends on draft night. In 52 games, he averaged 11.9 points, 4.1 assists, 3.3 rebounds and 1.3 steals in 27 minutes per game.

On November 30, 2016, Miller was traded to the Sioux Falls Skyforce in exchange for the player rights to Byron Wesley and a 2017 third-round draft pick. On December 3, he made his debut for the Skyforce in a 117–101 win over the Iowa Energy, recording 14 points, one rebound, four assists and one block in 19 minutes off the bench.

On September 20, 2017, Miller signed a two-year deal with Serbian club Partizan. On January 14, 2018, he left Partizan and signed with Turkish club Gaziantep for the rest of the 2017–18 season.

On October 29, 2019, he has signed with Boulazac Basket Dordogne of LNB Pro A. Miller averaged 12.9 points, 2.6 rebounds and 5.1 assists per game. 

On August 17, 2020, he signed with Ironi Nes Ziona of the Israeli Premier League.

On August 23, 2021, he signed with the Juventus Utena of the Lithuanian Basketball League.

On November 7, 2022, he signed with Brose Bamberg of the Basketball Bundesliga (BBL).

Personal life
Miller is the son of Michelle Adams and Preston Miller.

References

External links
 Tennessee State bio
 RealGM profile

1992 births
Living people
ABA League players
American men's basketball players
American expatriate basketball people in the Dominican Republic
American expatriate basketball people in France
American expatriate basketball people in Germany
American expatriate basketball people in Israel
American expatriate basketball people in Serbia
American expatriate basketball people in Turkey
Basketball players from Chicago
Beşiktaş men's basketball players
Boulazac Basket Dordogne players
Brose Bamberg players
Gaziantep Basketbol players
Ironi Nes Ziona B.C. players
KK Partizan players
Point guards
Ratiopharm Ulm players
Sioux Falls Skyforce players
Tennessee State Tigers basketball players
Texas Legends players
Yeşilgiresun Belediye players